The Colour Room is a 2021 British biographical drama film directed by Claire McCarthy from a screenplay by Claire Peate. The film stars Phoebe Dynevor (in her feature film debut), Matthew Goode, David Morrissey, Darci Shaw, Kerry Fox
and Luke Norris. It is based on the life of 1920s/30s ceramic artist Clarice Cliff.

Background

Despite resistance, Clarice Cliff persisted in suggesting her ideas while working on the factory floor of potteries. Instead of mastering one skill improve her earnings, she started one apprenticeship as an enameller, then another as a lithographer at another factory to learn all the tricks of the trade. As someone supporting her widowed mother and sister, she risked destitution by changing jobs so often. All the factories still had Victorian perceptions of what women wanted, producing twee pottery with rosebuds. Cliff then got a job as apprentice modeller at another factory, a role rarely taken by a woman, apprenticed to designer, Fred Ridgeway. Fortunately the factory owner, Colley Shorter, appreciated her talent. Because of the 1926 miner’s strike, there was not enough material to make pots. Cliff knew that there was a huge stock of undecorated sub-standard goods. She covered up the imperfections with bright Art Deco-style patterns, instead of traditional designs, thereby creating her Art Deco Bizarre range. During the Great Depression, the factory survived because of her designs. She embarked on an affair with Shorter, (eventually they married after his wife's death in 1940). The skeptical head salesman took the goods to a shop in Oxford because they had a female buyer. The shop bought the entire stock. Shorter and Cliff engaged in intense marketing aimed at women with celebrity endorsements to make the range fashionable.

Cast

Production
The film was developed by Caspian Films, Sky Cinema, and Creative England with Thembisa Cochrane and Georgie Paget producing and Neil Jones co-producing. Laura Grange of Sky, Paul Ashton of Creative England, and David Gilbery, Charlie Dorfman, and Marlon Vogelgesang of Media Finance Capital are executive producing. It is directed by Claire McCarthy and written by Claire Peate.

It was announced in March 2021 that Phoebe Dynevor would play Cliff with Matthew Goode starring alongside her as Colley Shorter. Also cast were Kerry Fox, David Morrissey, Darci Shaw, and Luke Norris.

Principal photography took place on location in Stoke-on-Trent and Birmingham. Local papers reported crew at the Gladstone Pottery Museum in Longton.

Release
A screening was held in London on 28 October 2021. The film premiered on Sky Cinema and in cinemas on 12 November 2021.

References

External links
 
 The Colour Room at Caspian Films
 ''True Story behind the film

2021 films
2021 biographical drama films
Biographical films about artists
British biographical drama films
British historical drama films
British feminist films
Films set in Staffordshire
Films set in the 1920s
2020s English-language films
Films directed by Claire McCarthy
2020s British films